Californian (ship) may refer to the following ships:

 , the "Official Tall Ship Ambassador for the State of California"
 , the cargo-passenger ship of the Leyland Line, notable for inaction while near the sinking RMS Titanic in April 1912; the ship was built in 1901 and sunk on 9 November 1915, during World War I, by German submarine U-35
 SS Californian, the name of the T2 tanker  between 1970 and 1975
 , a cargo ship built for the American-Hawaiian Steamship Company in 1900; taken up for service with the United States Navy during World War I and sunk by a naval mine in June 1918

See also
 Californian (disambiguation)
 
 

Ship names